Jesús Serrano (born 3 July 1978) is a Spanish sport shooter who specializes in trap.

At the 2008 Olympic Games he finished in joint tenth place in the trap qualification, missing a place among the top six, who progressed to the final round.

At the 2012 Olympic Games he qualified for the final round. After the final round he finished in fifth place.

References

1978 births
Living people
Spanish male sport shooters
Shooters at the 2008 Summer Olympics
Olympic shooters of Spain
Trap and double trap shooters
Shooters at the 2012 Summer Olympics
European Games competitors for Spain
Shooters at the 2015 European Games
21st-century Spanish people